The Cercle Solleric (in Spanish Círculo Sollerense) is a sporting and cultural association. It was founded in 1899 in Sóller (Majorca, Balearic Islands, Spain).

Facility
Ground floor: cafe and restaurant
First floor: library room, card playing room
Second floor: cinema and television room, carom billiards room
Third floor: chess room

Sport sections
 Athletics
 Chess
 Women's football 
 Futsal
 Mountain climbing and hiking

References

External links
Official web site 

1899 establishments in Spain
Organizations established in 1899
Sóller
Culture of Mallorca